The Pircas Negras Pass (Spanish: Paso Pircas Negras) is a pass over the Andes mountains which connects Argentina and Chile. The border crossing between Argentina and Chile is at  AMSL.

Gallery

See also 

Atacama Region
La Rioja Province, Argentina

References 

Argentina–Chile border crossings
Mountain passes of Chile
Mountain passes of Argentina
Mountain passes of the Andes
Landforms of Atacama Region
Landforms of La Rioja Province, Argentina